Aymeric of Piacenza (born Piacenza, Italy; died 19 August 1327, Bologna) was an Italian Dominican scholar, who became Master of the Order of Preachers. He was involved in both the suppression of the Fraticelli, and the downfall of the Templars.

See also

References

Attribution

Italian Dominicans
Italian scholars
1327 deaths
Year of birth unknown
Masters of the Order of Preachers